Acts 7 is the seventh chapter of the Acts of the Apostles in the New Testament of the Christian Bible. It records the address of Stephen before the Sanhedrin and his execution outside  Jerusalem, and introduces Saul (who later became Paul the Apostle). The book containing this chapter is anonymous, but early Christian tradition uniformly affirmed that Luke composed this book as well as the Gospel of Luke.

Text
The original text was written in Koine Greek and is divided into 60 verses.

Textual witnesses
Some early manuscripts containing the text of this chapter are:
In Greek
 Codex Vaticanus (AD 325–350)
 Codex Sinaiticus (330–360)
 Codex Bezae (~400)
 Codex Alexandrinus (400–440)
 Codex Ephraemi Rescriptus (~450)
 Codex Laudianus (~550)
 Papyrus 33 (~550)
In Latin
León palimpsest (7th century; extant verses 27–60)

Old Testament references
 : 
 : ; 
 : 
 : 
 : 
 : 
 : 
 : 
 : 
 : 
 : Psalm 
 :

Stephen's speech (7:1–53)
On the surface, Stephen's speech seemingly did match the charges against him, but the recorded words apparently are a part of a 'larger polemical discourse, building on and developing the arguments already put forward in the sermons and trial speeches of the apostles'. It can be categorized into 'rewritten Bible', "a selective retelling
of biblical history from a particular theological standpoint", in similar form as Psalm 105, among others in the Bible.

Verse 16
This verse has been studied extensively by theologians because the speech of Stephen seems to contradict Genesis:
and they were carried back to Shechem and laid in the tomb that Abraham had bought for a sum of silver from the sons of Hamor in Shechem.

Stephen's death (7:54–60)
The reaction of the audience to Stephen's speech reached a dramatic high point in verse 54 and heightened even
further Stephen's description of his vision in verses 55–56. Stephen's vision of God's glory has a continuity with his speech on Abraham (7:2) and Moses (cf. ), but now extends to the open
heaven (verse 56) with the figure of Jesus himself positioned 'at the right hand of God' (verse 55) denoting the highest
place of honor and confirming Stephen's claim that the rejected savior is in fact God's 'Righteous One'. Stephen as 'the prototype for Christian martyrdom' dies 'calling on the name

Verse 55
But he, being full of the Holy Ghost, looked up stedfastly into heaven, and saw the glory of God, and Jesus standing on the right hand of God,

Verse 58
and they cast him out of the city and stoned him. And the witnesses laid down their clothes at the feet of a young man named Saul.
"Cast him out of the city": This action recalls the commandment of Leviticus 24:14, 23:
Take the blasphemer outside the camp ... and they took the blasphemer outside the camp, and stoned him to death.

Verse 59
And they stoned Stephen as he was calling on God and saying, "Lord Jesus, receive my spirit."

The Pulpit Commentary notes Stephen's words in Acts 7:59 as a 'striking acknowledgment of the divinity of Christ: only he who gave the spirit could receive it back again'.

Verse 60
Then he knelt down and cried out with a loud voice, "Lord, do not charge them with this sin." And when he had said this, he fell asleep.

Alexander MacLaren noted that this verse contains 'the only narrative in the New Testament of a Christian martyrdom or death'.

Uses 
The phrase "Living oracles" or "Living words", taken from Acts 7:38, appears in Greek on the heraldric seal of Columbia University, printed on the book held in the central figure's hand, and signifying the passing down of knowledge.

See also
 Abraham
 Burning Bush
 Jacob
 Joseph (son of Jacob)
 Moses
 Sanhedrin
 Saint Stephen
 Related Bible parts: Book of Genesis, Book of Exodus, Book of Deuteronomy, Luke 23, Acts 6, Acts 8, Acts 21

References

Sources

External links
 King James Bible - Wikisource
English Translation with Parallel Latin Vulgate
Online Bible at GospelHall.org (ESV, KJV, Darby, American Standard Version, Bible in Basic English)
Multiple bible versions at Bible Gateway (NKJV, NIV, NRSV etc.)

07
Sanhedrin